Courts of Massachusetts include:
;State courts of Massachusetts
Judicial courts
 Massachusetts Supreme Judicial Court
 Massachusetts Appeals Court
 Massachusetts Trial Court
 Massachusetts Superior Court (14 divisions)
 Massachusetts District Court
 Massachusetts Boston Municipal Court
 Massachusetts Land Court
 Massachusetts Housing Court
 Massachusetts Juvenile Court
 Massachusetts Probate and Family Court

Administrative courts
 Massachusetts Appellate Tax Board
 Massachusetts Division of Labor Relations

Federal courts located in Massachusetts
 United States Court of Appeals for the First Circuit (headquartered in Boston, having jurisdiction over the United States District Courts of Maine, Massachusetts, New Hampshire, Rhode Island, and Puerto Rico)
 United States District Court for the District of Massachusetts

See also
 Judiciary of Massachusetts
 Counties of Massachusetts

References

External links
 National Center for State Courts – directory of state court websites.

Courts in the United States
Government of Massachusetts